Anant Singh (born May 1956, Durban) is a South African film producer and a member of the International Olympic Committee (IOC).

Education
Singh attended the University of Durban-Westville, in South Africa.

Career
Singh is the CEO of Videovision Entertainment, and the producer of "Mandela: Long Walk to Freedom" which premiered in 2013 at the Toronto International Film Festival. Singh spent more than two decades on producing the film, in which he also interviewed Mandela while he was still imprisoned. The film took more than sixteen years to complete.
He is also chairman of Cape Town Film Studios and can be accredited for over 100 films.

Filmography

Film

Television

Sport
Singh entered the IOC in 2016, where he became Chair of the Communications Commission in 2018. He is also part of the Olympic Channel Commission since 2015, the Digital and Technology Commission since 2018, and the Coordination of the Games of the XXXIV Olympiad Los Angeles 2028 Commission since 2019. Singh is the producer of the sports-themed films "The Long Run" and "More than Just a Game".

Awards
 Peabody Awards (2005)
 Crystal Award at the World Economic Forum
 Golden Horn Award for Outstanding Contribution (2006)
 Honorary doctorate at the Durban University of Technology's Fred Crookes Sports Centre. (2014)
 Honorary doctorates from the University of KwaZulu-Natal and the University of Port Elizabeth.
 Doctorate in Technology (2017)

References

1956 births
International Olympic Committee members
South African sports executives and administrators
University of Durban-Westville alumni
University of South Africa alumni
Living people